Otucha is a genus of moths in the family Geometridae. It contains only one species, Otucha adminiculata, which is found on New Guinea.

References

External links

Eupitheciini
Taxa named by William Warren (entomologist)
Moth genera